Michael Nugent (born March 2, 1982) is a former American football placekicker. He played college football for Ohio State University, and was twice recognized as a consensus All-American. He was drafted by the New York Jets in the second round of the 2005 NFL Draft, and has also played for the Tampa Bay Buccaneers, Arizona Cardinals, Cincinnati Bengals, Dallas Cowboys, Chicago Bears, Oakland Raiders, and New England Patriots.

Early years
Nugent was born in Centerville, Ohio.  He attended Centerville High School, and played kicker and quarterback on the Elks football team. He was a teammate of linebacker A. J. Hawk on the school's football team.

As a senior kicker, he converted on five out of seven field goal attempts of greater than fifty yards (24 of 27 altogether), kicked a 55-yard field goal twice, and was 29 out of 29 extra point attempts.

College career
While attending Ohio State University, Nugent played for coach Jim Tressel's Ohio State Buckeyes football team from 2001 to 2004.  During his four-year career at Ohio State, he broke or tied 22 school records, including most points in a career by any player at Ohio State (356).

He completed 72 of 88 field goal attempts and 140 of 143 extra point attempts.  He was recognized as a consensus first-team All-American as a sophomore in 2002 and again as a unanimous All-American senior in 2004, and received the Lou Groza Award as the nation's top college placekicker in 2004.

Nugent also was part of three Bowl wins - 2003 & 2004 Fiesta Bowl / 2004 Alamo Bowl, and was part of the 2002 Ohio State Buckeyes Division I National Championship team.  He became the first kicker in school history to earn team most valuable player honors.

Career statistics

Professional career

New York Jets
Nugent was selected by the New York Jets in the second round (47th overall) of the 2005 NFL Draft. During the opening game of the 2008 NFL season, Nugent injured his quadriceps following an extra point. To replace Nugent the Jets signed Jay Feely, who performed so well in the position that he became the Jets' starter while Nugent, who eventually recovered from his injury, was forced to stay on the bench.

Tampa Bay Buccaneers
As an unrestricted free agent in the 2009 offseason, Nugent signed a one-year contract with the Tampa Bay Buccaneers on March 4 and won the job over Matt Bryant in the preseason due to Bryant's injury. After converting just two of his first six tries (2 blocked) through four games, Nugent was released by the Buccaneers on October 5.

Arizona Cardinals
Nugent signed with the Arizona Cardinals on December 16, 2009 as a temporary replacement for the injured Neil Rackers. He was waived by the Cardinals on January 2, 2010.

Cincinnati Bengals

Nugent signed with the Cincinnati Bengals on April 23, 2010.  He competed with Dave Rayner throughout training camp and the preseason for the Bengals starting job.  Nugent eventually won the competition when the Bengals released Rayner on September 4, 2010, after Nugent made 54- and 52-yard field goals in the team's final two preseason games. Nugent was named the AFC Special Teams Player of the Month for the month of September by going 8 for 8 on field goal tries in the Bengals' first three games of the season.

In 2011, Nugent set franchise records for points (132) and field goals (33).  He signed a one-year contract tender with the Bengals for the 2012 season, and on March 10, 2013, the Bengals re-signed Nugent to a two-year deal. On September 7, 2014, Nugent tied the NFL record for most field goals made in one half with 5.

On January 4, 2015, Nugent kicked a career-long 58-yard field goal during the AFC first-round playoff game against the Indianapolis Colts. On October 11, 2015, Nugent made a winning field goal against the Seattle Seahawks in overtime in Week 5, 2015.

In Nugent‘s seven year run in Cincinnati, he helped the Bengals win the AFC North Division Championship in 2013 and 2015. He also played in the Bengals 2011, 2012, 2013, 2014, and 2015 AFC Wild-Card Playoff games.

"Mike is a tremendous teammate and has been an integral part of the Bengals for seven seasons," Bengals Head Coach Marvin Lewis said in a press release. "This was a difficult decision, but one we felt was in the best interest of the football team moving forward."

Nugent was released by the Bengals on December 13, 2016, after missing his sixth extra point of the season.

New York Giants
On August 1, 2017, Nugent signed with the New York Giants where he would compete with Aldrick Rosas for the starting position. At the conclusion of the preseason, Nugent was cut from the Giants' roster on September 2, 2017.

Dallas Cowboys
On October 24, 2017, Nugent was signed by the Dallas Cowboys as a stand-in for injured Dan Bailey, reuniting with Rich Bisaccia who was his special teams coach with the Tampa Bay Buccaneers. He was released on November 26, after Bailey was deemed healthy from his previous groin injury. He made 7 out of 9 field goals in four games.

Chicago Bears
On December 4, 2017, the Chicago Bears signed Nugent to replace the injured Cairo Santos. In Week 17, Nugent tied his personal record when he converted a 55-yard field goal.

Oakland Raiders
On August 4, 2018, Nugent signed with the Oakland Raiders. He was placed on injured reserve on September 26, 2018 after suffering a hip injury in Week 3.

New England Patriots
On October 3, 2019, Nugent signed with the New England Patriots after they placed Stephen Gostkowski on injured reserve. He was released on October 29, 2019 after missing two kicks in a game against the Cleveland Browns. In four games with the Patriots, Nugent went 5-of-8 on field goals and 15-of-16 on extra points.

Arizona Cardinals (second stint)
On September 18, 2020, Nugent was signed to the Arizona Cardinals practice squad. He was elevated to the active roster on December 12 and December 19 for the team's weeks 14 and 15 games against the New York Giants and Philadelphia Eagles, and reverted to the practice squad after each game. On December 25, 2020, Nugent was promoted to the active roster. His only missed field goal came against the Los Angeles Rams in Week 17 when the kick was blocked.

NFL career statistics

References

External links

 Cincinnati Bengals bio

1982 births
Living people
Players of American football from Dayton, Ohio
American football placekickers
Ohio State Buckeyes football players
All-American college football players
New York Jets players
Tampa Bay Buccaneers players
Arizona Cardinals players
Cincinnati Bengals players
New York Giants players
Dallas Cowboys players
Chicago Bears players
Oakland Raiders players
New England Patriots players
Ed Block Courage Award recipients